Robert C. Gooding (1918–1999) was a Vice Admiral in the United States Navy.    Gooding graduated the United States Naval Academy in 1942.

On August 2, 1972, Gooding assumed command of the Naval Ship Systems Command, relieving VADM Nathan Sonnenshein.  This command continued through the transition of Naval Ship Systems Command to Naval Sea Systems Command.

He was awarded the Legion of Merit and the Navy Distinguished Service Medal.

In 1976, he was elected to the National Academy of Engineering.

References

1918 births
1999 deaths
United States Navy vice admirals
Burials at Arlington National Cemetery
Recipients of the Navy Distinguished Service Medal
Recipients of the Legion of Merit
NAVSEA commanders
United States Naval Academy alumni
United States Navy personnel of World War II